The 1949 season was the Hawthorn Football Club's 25th season in the Victorian Football League and 48th overall.

Fixture

Premiership Season

Ladder

References

Hawthorn Football Club seasons